This is a list of Belgian television related events from 1968.

Events
13 February - Claude Lombard is selected to represent Belgium at the 1968 Eurovision Song Contest with his song "Quand tu reviendras". He is selected to be the thirteenth Belgian Eurovision entry during Eurosong.

Debuts

Television shows

Ending this year

Births

Deaths